Ariful Kabir Farhad (born 12 March 1980) is a retired Bangladeshi professional footballer who played as a centre forward. He played for the Bangladesh national team from 2003 to 2006.

International career
Farhad scored his first goal for Bangladesh against Bhutan during the 2003 SAFF Cup group stages. He managed to get a brace in that game as Bangladesh won (3-0) and topped the group. Farhad also got a couple of goals against Bhutan during the 2005 SAFF Cup. On 16 August 2006, Farhad played his last game for Bangladesh in a 4-1 defeat to Qatar.

International goals
Scores and results list Bangladesh's goal tally first

Personal life
After retirement, Farhad represented his hometown Chittagong District football team, and also played in the M Agency Veteran Football Tournament, with Chittagong Masters Club.

Honours
Muktijoddha Sangsad KC
Federation Cup = 2001, 2003
National Football Championship = 2003

Abahanai Limited Dhaka
Independence Gold Cup (Rajshahi) = 2005

Bangladesh
SAFF Championship = 2003

References

   
Living people
1980 births
Muktijoddha Sangsad KC players
Mohammedan SC (Dhaka) players
Bangladeshi footballers
Bangladesh international footballers
Association football forwards